ERH may refer to: 
 ERH (gene), coding for enhancer of rudimentary homolog
 ERH, the IATA airport code for Moulay Ali Cherif Airport, Errichidia, Morocco
 Electrical resistance heating
 Era Aviation, a defunct American airline
 Erith railway station, in London
 Eruwa language
 Extended Riemann hypothesis
 Nieh Erh (1912–1935), Chinese composer